Threemile Creek is a stream in Hocking County, Ohio. It is a tributary of the Hocking River.

See also
List of rivers of Ohio

References

Rivers of Hocking County, Ohio
Rivers of Ohio